Francis Martin (1652–1722) was an Irish Augustinian.

Biography
He was born in Galway during the occupation of the town by the Cromwellian army, his family been one of the Tribes of Galway. He was educated in one of the secret schools in the city. In 1673 he began his studies for the priesthood in Louvain with the Augustinian order. Ordained there in 1680, he was the following year appointed Professor of Greek at the college. In the 1680s he was deeply involved in defending Papal Pronouncement against the Jansenists. He took his D.D. in 1688.

In 1691 he became Professor of Divinity at Mechelen, where he published two theses which led to his dismissal. However, he was re-appointed to his old post in Louvain, and in 1694 became its professor of Scripture. Subsequently, he was appointed Vice-President of the college, and in the same year he was made a Canon of St. Peter's.

In 1714, Martin wrote a letter to Edward Synge, the Protestant Archbishop of Tuam, in an effort to convert him to Catholicism. 
Archbishop Synge refused, but said of Francis Martin that he was a man who preserved something of freedom in his judgement [and] meant well at bottom.

Francis Martin died at Bruges on 4 October 1722, where he is buried in the grounds of St. John's Hospital.

Note
Among his relations was Richard Martyn (c. 1600–1648), the noted Irish Confederate. He was also distantly related to F.X. Martin, (Francis Xaviar Martin), (1922 – 13 February 2000).

Bibliography
 Refuatio Justificationis editae pro defendenda doctrini Henrici Denys, Louvain, 1700.
 L'etat Presant de la Faculte de Theologie de Louvain, Trevoux, 1701, pp. 247–2,250.
 Statera Quaestionis an ad fidem pertineat Sanctis in coelo notas esse mortalium preces, Louvain, 1710.
 Scutum fidei contra haereses hodiernas; seu Tillotsonianae concionis sub titulo; strena opportuna contra papisuum refutatio auctore ... Francisco Martin Iberno - Galviensi ... Louvain, Michael Zangrius, 1714, National Library of Ireland
 Avertissment touchant les pretendus Avis Salutaries, Louvain, 1719.
 motivum Jurvis pro Bullae Unigenitus Orthodixia, Louvain, 1720.
 Avis Salutaires a Messieurs les Protestans et Deliberaus de Louvain, Louvain.
 Via pacis, a thesis.

See also
 The Tribes of Galway

Notes

References
 
 Galway Authors, Helen Mahar, 1976.

1652 births
1722 deaths
People from County Galway
Irish writers
17th-century Irish Roman Catholic priests
18th-century Irish Roman Catholic priests
Irish expatriates in France
Irish expatriates in Belgium
Old University of Leuven alumni
Academic staff of the Old University of Leuven